The Telestar was a former German television award, created by Das Erste and ZDF. It was succeeded in 1999 by the Deutscher Fernsehpreis. In 1999, the Telestar was replaced by the German Television Award from ARD, ZDF, RTL, and Sat.1.

References

German television awards
ZDF
ARD (broadcaster)